Lina Khalifeh (born 1986) is a Jordanian black belt taekwondo champion, after winning medals for the Jordanian team, she decided to extend her career past the martial arts.

In 2010, after she found out that one of her friends was attacked and beaten up by her father and brother, she decided to start giving mixed martial arts self-defense classes from her parent’s basement, building up on that, she opened her own self-defense center named “She Fighter” in 2012 with the goal to teach women in Amman to defend themselves since sexual harassment and act of aggression were common in her country.

Early life 

Lina Khalifeh started to over train, injuring herself in the process. At the age of 22, she torn her ACL, and after 2 surgeries, she did not recover well. Doctors informed her that she could not do martial arts anymore. She described this period as “the lowest point of my life”

Career 

Lina has also worked for four years as a marketing manager in her family's firm in Jordan, where she manufactured educational items (white boards, black boards, electronic boards, and so on) and marketed them abroad.

Achievements 
Some of the many Conferences Lina was invited to speak at:

The Business of Fashion Summit 2019,The Economic World Forum 2019, Women in the World Summit 2019, Dragon Fly 2019 Thailand, European Development Summit 2018, European Parliament 2015, One Young World 2016, Concordia Summit (Virtual) 2020, Los Angeles Tribunate (Virtual) 2020 and BMO Bank (Virtual) 2020.
She was also selected by the She Entrepreneur program to present her work to the Swedish royal family.
She was one of the "leaders of social change" presented by Barack Obama at the white house.
She was featured at the TED conference as part of the TEDWomen conferences to talk about her work.

Recognition 
She was recognized as one of the BBC's 100 women of 2017.

References 

1986 births
Living people
Jordanian female taekwondo practitioners
21st-century Jordanian women
BBC 100 Women